David Sorkin is the Lucy G. Moses professor of Jewish history at Yale University. Sorkin specializes in the intersection of Jewish and European history, and has published several prominent books including Jewish Emancipation: A History Across Five Centuries.

Career
Sorkin graduated from the University of Wisconsin–Madison in 1975 (Phi Beta Kappa). In 1977 he received a Masters degree in Comparative Literature, and in 1983 a PhD in History from the University of California, Berkeley.

From 1983 to 1986 he worked as Assistant Professor of Judaic studies at Brown University. In 1986 he became a Research Fellow and in 1990 a lecturer in Modern History at Oxford University. He was a Governing Body Fellow at St. Antony's College and a Fellow of the Oxford Centre for Postgraduate Hebrew Studies. From 1992 to 2011 he was Frances and Laurence Weinstein Professor of Jewish Studies and Professor of History at the University of Wisconsin–Madison. At the University of Wisconsin he helped build the Mosse-Weinstein Center for Jewish Studies and the Mosse Program.  He also directed the Institute for Research in the Humanities (2003-2007). From 2011 to 2014 he served as Distinguished Professor of History at the Graduate Center of the City University of New York. In 2014 he moved to Yale where he is the Lucy G. Moses Professor in the Department of History and Program in Judaic Studies.

Sorkin has published several prominent works on Jewish history. His first book, The Transformation of German Jewry, 1780–1840 published in 1987, argued that Jewish culture in the German states constituted a "subculture." In 1996 he wrote Moses Mendelssohn and the Religious Enlightenment, a concise study of Mendelssohn's Jewish thought in which he emphasized the neglected Hebrew writings. The book has been translated into French, German, and Italian.

In 2000 he wrote The Berlin Haskalah and German Religious Thought: Orphans of Knowledge. The book, first delivered in 1997 as the Sherman Lectures in the Department of Religions and Theology at Manchester University (UK), argued that the Haskalah should be understood within the context of wider Central European religious and intellectual changes. In The Religious Enlightenment: Protestants, Jews, and Catholics from London to Vienna (Jews, Christians, and Muslims from the Ancient to the Modern World) published in 2008, Sorkin reconceived the relationship of the Enlightenment to religion.  His most recent book is Jewish Emancipation:  A History Across Five Centuries (2019), the first comprehensive study of the subject.

Sorkin has co-edited three volumes: Profiles in Diversity: Jews in a Changing Europe, 1750-1870 (1998), New Perspectives on the Haskalah (2001), and What History Tells: George L. Mosse and the Culture of Modern Europe (2004). He  served as associate editor of The Oxford Handbook of Jewish Studies (2002), which won the National Jewish Book Award.  With Edward Breuer as co-editor and translator he published,Moses Mendelssohn's Hebrew Writings (Yale Judaic Studies, Yale University Press, 2018).

Reception
Sorkin's books have had a notable impact. The American Historical Review described Sorkin's  The Religious Enlightenment: Protestants, Jews, and Catholics from London to Vienna as a work that makes "very interesting discoveries about the parallel developments within different religions in the eighteenth century." Similarly, The New York Times  described it as a "persuasive work" about how "Europe's major religions produced movements of religious reform compatible with the enlightenment."  Central European History reviewed it as a book of "very great importance, for early modernists and modern historians alike."

Sorkin has received fellowships from the National Endowment for the Humanities (1994-5) and the John Simon Guggenheim Memorial Foundation (2005–06).  He is a fellow of the American Academy for Jewish Research.

Awards
 1988 Joel H. Cavior Literary Award for History (The Transformation of German Jewry)
 2003 National Jewish Book Award for Scholarship (Oxford Handbook of Jewish Studies)
 2010 Dorothy and Hsin-Nung Yao Teaching Award (History, UW-Madison)
 2019 Moses Mendelssohn Award (Leo Baeck Institute, New York)

Bibliography
 Jewish Emancipation:  A History Across Five Centuries (Princeton University Press, 2019) 
 The Transformation of German Jewry, 1780-1840 (Oxford University Press, 1987) (pbk. 1990); New edition (Wayne State University Press, 1999) 
 The Religious Enlightenment: Protestants, Jews, and Catholics from London to Vienna (Jews, Christians, and Muslims from the Ancient to the Modern World) (Princeton University Press, 2008) 
 Berlin Haskalah and German Religious Thought: Orphans of Knowledge (Parkes-Wiener Series on Jewish Studies) (Vallentine Mitchell, 1999) 
 Moses Mendelssohn and the Religious Enlightenment (Jewish Thinkers) (University of California Press, 1996)

See also
 Port Jew

External links
 Yale University faculty page

References

Jewish historians
Historians of Jews and Judaism
20th-century American historians
Year of birth missing (living people)
Living people
Yale University faculty
University of Wisconsin–Madison alumni
University of California, Berkeley alumni
Jewish American writers
21st-century American Jews
21st-century American historians